A thyroidectomy is an operation that involves the surgical removal of all or part of the thyroid gland.  In general surgery, endocrine or head and neck surgeons often perform a thyroidectomy when a patient has thyroid cancer or some other condition of the thyroid gland (such as hyperthyroidism) or goiter. Other indications for surgery include cosmetic (very enlarged thyroid), or symptomatic obstruction (causing difficulties in swallowing or breathing). Thyroidectomy is a common surgical procedure that has several potential complications or sequelae including: temporary or permanent change in voice, temporary or permanently low calcium, need for lifelong thyroid hormone replacement, bleeding, infection, and the remote possibility of airway obstruction due to bilateral vocal cord paralysis.  Complications are uncommon when the procedure is performed by an experienced surgeon.

The thyroid produces several hormones, such as thyroxine (T4), triiodothyronine (T3), and calcitonin. After the removal of a thyroid, patients usually take a prescribed oral synthetic thyroid hormone—levothyroxine (Synthroid)—to prevent hypothyroidism. Less extreme variants of thyroidectomy include:
 Hemithyroidectomy (or unilateral lobectomy): removing only half of the thyroid
 Isthmectomy: removing the band of tissue (or isthmus) connecting the two lobes of the thyroid

A thyroidectomy should not be confused with a thyroidotomy (thyrotomy), which is a cutting into (‑otomy) the thyroid, not a removal (‑ectomy, literally “out-cutting”) of it. A thyroidotomy can be performed to get access for a median laryngotomy, or to perform a biopsy. (Although technically a biopsy involves removing some tissue, it is more frequently categorized as an ‑otomy than an ‑ectomy because the volume of tissue removed is minuscule.)

Traditionally, the thyroid has been removed through a neck incision that leaves a permanent scar. More recently, minimally invasive and "scarless" approaches such as transoral thyroidectomy have become popular in some parts of the world. In the United States, over 100,000 procedures are performed yearly as it is a common procedure.

Uses 
Thyroidectomy is used in the treatment of:
 Thyroid cancer
 Toxic thyroid nodule (produces too much thyroid hormone)
 Multinodular goiter (enlarged thyroid gland with many nodules), especially if there is compression of nearby structures
 Graves' disease, especially if there is exophthalmos (bulging eyes)
 Thyroid nodule, if fine needle aspirate (FNA) results are unclear

Types 

 Hemithyroidectomy — Entire isthmus is removed along with 1 lobe. Done in benign diseases of only 1 lobe.
 Subtotal thyroidectomy — Removal of majority of both lobes leaving behind 4-5 grams (equivalent to the size of a normal thyroid gland) of thyroid tissue on one or both sides—this used to be the most common operation for multinodular goitre.
 Partial thyroidectomy —Removal of gland in front of trachea after mobilization. Done in nontoxic MNG. Its role is controversial.
 Near total thyroidectomy — Both lobes are removed except for a small amount of thyroid tissue (on one or both sides) in the vicinity of the recurrent laryngeal nerve entry point and the superior parathyroid gland.
 Total thyroidectomy — Entire gland is removed. Done in cases of papillary or follicular carcinoma of thyroid, medullary carcinoma of thyroid. This is now also the most common operation for multinodular goitre.
 Hartley Dunhill operation — Removal of 1 entire lateral lobe with isthmus and partial/subtotal removal of opposite lateral lobe. Done in nontoxic MNG.

Complications 
 Hypothyroidism in up to 50% of patients after ten years.
 Laryngeal nerve injury in about 1% of patients, in particular the recurrent laryngeal nerve: Unilateral damage results in a hoarse voice. Bilateral damage presents as laryngeal obstruction after surgery and can be a surgical emergency: an emergency tracheostomy may be needed. Recurrent Laryngeal nerve injury may occur during the ligature of the inferior thyroid artery.
 Hypoparathyroidism temporary (transient) in many patients, but permanent in about 1 to 4% of patients
 Anesthetic complications
 Infection (at about a 2% rate. Drainage is an important part of treatment.), possibly an increased risk with chronic pre-operative steroid use.
 Stitch granuloma
 Chyle leak
 Haemorrhage/Hematoma (This may compress the airway, becoming life-threatening.)
 Removal or devascularization of the parathyroids

History 
Al-Zahrawi, a tenth century Arab physician, sometimes referred to as the "Father of surgery", is credited with the performance of the first thyroidectomy.

See also 
 List of surgeries by type

References

External links
 Early postoperative scar images
 Thyroid Surgery Tutorial From the Patient Education Institute

Surgical oncology
Surgical removal procedures
Thyroid disease
Endocrine surgery
Thyroidological methods